During the 1962–63 English football season, Ipswich Town F.C. competed in the Football League First Division. As defending league champions, they also participated in the European Cup, the club's first foray into European competition.

Summary
Ipswich struggled badly to repeat the form of their title-winning campaign. A 5–1 defeat to Tottenham Hotspur at Portman Road in the Charity Shield set the pattern as Ipswich spent most of the season fighting against relegation. They took just one point from their opening three league matches, just as they had done a year previously, but this time there was no upturn in form until a late rally (six wins and four draws from the final 12 matches) enabled them to finish in 17th place, four points clear of the drop zone.

Ipswich's European Cup campaign began in the preliminary round with a 14–1 aggregate win over Maltese champions Floriana, with Ray Crawford scoring seven goals across the two ties. In the first round, Ipswich faced Italian giants A.C. Milan and were unable to overturn a 3–0 defeat in the San Siro, despite winning the second leg 2–1 at Portman Road. Milan went on to win the trophy, beating Benfica in the final at Wembley.

On 25 October 1962, Ipswich manager Alf Ramsey agreed to take charge of the England national team, commencing 1 May 1963. His replacement was Newcastle United legend Jackie Milburn, who oversaw the final four matches of the season.

Squad
Players who made one appearance or more for Ipswich Town F.C. during the 1962-63 season

League standings

Results
Home team listed first

Charity Shield

Division One

European Cup

FA Cup

References

Bibliography

Ipswich Town F.C. seasons
Ipswich Town F.C.